The women's team sprint at the 2022 Commonwealth Games was part of the cycling programme, and took place on 29 July 2022.

Records
This is the first Commonwealth Games in which the women's team sprint will be contested under the new format of three riders racing 750m, so there is no existing Games record. The world record is as follows:

Schedule
The schedule is as follows:

All times are British Summer Time (UTC+1)

Results

Qualifying
The two fastest teams advanced to the gold medal final. The next two fastest teams advanced to the bronze medal final.

Finals

References

Cycling at the Commonwealth Games – Women's team sprint
Women's team sprint
Comm